Arena Football: Road to Glory is a PlayStation 2 video game developed by Electronic Arts (under their EA Sports brand). It was released on February 22, 2007, and was the follow up to their first Arena Football video game. The cover features fullback/linebacker Bob McMillen, from ArenaBowl XX's champion team, the Chicago Rush. The game includes all the rules, rosters, and teams for the AFL season. For the first time the Arena Football minor league, AF2, is included in the series.

Reception 

Arena Football: Road to Glory scored a 62/100 on Metacritic, indicating "mixed or average reviews". Siwicki Sports Feed, an independent opinion website, reviewed the game in 2018 and said it was "high flying, high scoring, and smashing people over the walls" fun. Also stating "the presentation and user interference  are awful. If you can get passed this, a fun and exciting game awaits."

References

External links
Official website

2007 video games
Road to Glory
Electronic Arts games
EA Sports games
North America-exclusive video games
PlayStation 2 games
PlayStation 2-only games
Multiplayer and single-player video games
Budcat Creations games